Jules Bentz (13 May 1873 – 14 October 1962) was a French composer, organist and Kapellmeister.

Biography 
Jules Bentz was born in Merxheim in Alsace during the German annexation. He began his musical studies at the Conservatoire de Strasbourg and completed them at the École Niedermeyer under the direction of Gustave Lefèvre, A. Georges, Ch. de Bériot, P. Viardot and Clément Loret.

After two years as a choir organist at Notre-Dame de Clignancourt, he later became organist and Kapellmeister at the église Sainte-Geneviève in Asnières.

Bentz wrote a very large number of motets and pieces for piano, organ, violin and orchestra.

Jules Bentz died in Asnières on 14 October 1962.

References

Bibliography 
 Biographical notes in Maîtres contemporains de l'orgue, Joseph Joubert, 1911.

External links 
 Musica et Memoria
 Bentz Jules  on BNPM.ch
  Jules Bentz (1873-1963) on avemariasongs.org
 

20th-century French composers
French classical organists
French male organists
People from Haut-Rhin
People from Alsace-Lorraine
1873 births
1962 deaths
20th-century French male musicians
Male classical organists